Alessandro Bruno (born 4 July 1983) is an Italian footballer. He currently plays as a midfielder for Serie D team Casarano.

Club career
On 23 January 2019 he returned to Pescara after 1.5 years at Livorno. On 29 August 2020 he moved to Casarano.

References

External links
Career statistics 

1983 births
Sportspeople from Benevento
Living people
Italian footballers
Association football midfielders
Serie A players
Serie B players
Serie C players
Benevento Calcio players
U.S. Catanzaro 1929 players
Vastese Calcio 1902 players
Taranto F.C. 1927 players
A.S.G. Nocerina players
Latina Calcio 1932 players
Delfino Pescara 1936 players
U.S. Livorno 1915 players
Footballers from Campania